Deepak Ghaisas is the chairman of Gencoval Strategic Services Pvt Ltd. Previously, he was the CEO from 1997 of India Operations and CFO of global operations from 1993 for I-flex Solutions Ltd., India. He has worked in the software industry since 1987.

Ghaisas has been involved in the software industry in a number of roles, including:

 Executive Member of The NASSCOM Executive Council
 Member of the CII Executive Council for Western India 

Deepak resigned from I-flex on 8 August 2008, just before it was renamed Oracle Financial Services Software.

References

External links
 Rediff interview
 Gencoval Strategic Services Pvt Ltd

Businesspeople from Mumbai
Living people
Chief financial officers
Indian chief executives
Year of birth missing (living people)